Ditch the Attitude, Pally is the second studio album of Iron Lung Corp, released in November 12, 2002 by Underground, Inc.

Track listing

Accolades

Personnel
Adapted from the Ditch the Attitude, Pally liner notes.

Iron Lung Corp
 Dan Brill – drums
 Dan Dinsmore – drums
 Jamie Duffy – guitar, electronics, production, recording, mixing, mastering
 Eliot Engelman – bass guitar
 Gregory A. Lopez – bass guitar
 Daniel Neet – vocals
 Ethan Novak – drums
 Jason Novak – electronics, guitar, vocals, editing, production, recording, mixing, mastering

Additional musicians
 F.J. DeSanto (as FJ Lincoln) – additional synthesizer
 Jeff Mrozek – musical assistance (1)
 Giorgia Novak – vocals (5)
 Sarah Orloff – vocals (4)
 Paris – guitar (2)

Production and design
 Contemporary Design – design
 Rick Furr – photography

Release history

References

External links 
 Ditch the Attitude, Pally at Discogs (list of releases)

2002 albums
Iron Lung Corp albums
Underground, Inc. albums